McGinnis is a surname. Notable people with the surname include:

Alan Loy McGinnis (1933–2005), American Christian psychotherapist and author
Austin MacGinnis (born 1995), American football player
Benoît McGinnis, Canadian actor
Charles McGinnis (1906–1995), American Olympic athlete
Dave McGinnis (born 1951), American football  coach
Donna McGinnis (born 1968), Canadian Olympic swimmer
Edward McGinnis, birth name of Eddie Large (1941–2020), British entertainer
Gary McGinnis (born 1963), Scottish football player
George McGinnis (born 1950), American professional basketball player
George McGinnis (disambiguation)
Harry Lee McGinnis (born 1927), American walking around the world
Howard Justus McGinnis (1882–1971), American academic
Ian McGinnis (born 1978), American basketball player
James D. McGinnis (born 1932), American real estate agent and politician from Delaware
John McGinnis, American legal professor and author
Jumbo McGinnis (1854–1934), American professional baseball player
Megan McGinnis, American stage actress
Michael McGinnis (disambiguation)
Mike McGinnis (born 1973), American saxophonist, clarinetist, and composer
Mindy McGinnis, American writer
Niall MacGinnis (1913-1977), Irish actor
Paul McGinnis (born 1973), American puppeteer
Rick McGinnis, Canadian columnist and photojournalist
Robert McGinnis (born 1926), American illustrator of paperback book covers and movie posters
Ross A. McGinnis (1987–2006), American soldier, Medal of Honor recipient
Ryan McGinnis, American actor and dancer
Sid McGinnis (born 1949), American musician and guitarist
Tom McGinnis (born 1947), American professional golfer
William McGinnis, American molecular biologist
William McGinnis (rafter), American whitewater rafter and author

Fictional characters
Terry McGinnis, character in the animated series Batman Beyond
Warren & Mary McGinnis, the parents of Terry McGinnis.
Matt McGinnis, the younger brother of Terry McGinnis.

See also
McGuinness

External links
 McGinnis at Behind the Name

Patronymic surnames
Surnames from given names